OCAC may refer to:
Overseas Community Affairs Council, Republic of China (Taiwan)
Oklahoma Collegiate Athletic Conference
Ontario Coalition for Abortion Clinics
Oregon College of Art & Craft
Organization of Central Asian Cooperation
Oxford City Athletic Club
Odisha Computer Application Centre
Old Catholic Apostolic Church